This is a list of non-extant papal tombs, which includes tombs not included on the list of extant papal tombs. Information about these tombs is generally incomplete and uncertain.

Chronologically, the main locations of destroyed or unknown papal tombs have been: the obscure tombs of the first two centuries of popes near Saint Peter, the repeated waves of translations from the Catacombs of Rome, the demolition of the papal tombs in Old St. Peter's Basilica, and the 1306 and 1361 fires in the Archbasilica of Saint John Lateran.

Papal tombs have also been destroyed by other instances of fire, remodeling, and war (most recently, World War II). Others are unknown due to creative or geographically remote methods of martyrdom, or—in the case of Pope Clement I—both. Burial in churches outside the Aurelian Walls of Rome (Italian: fuori le Mura)—in the basilicas of Paul or Lorenzo—have not generally survived.

Main locations
The main locations of destroyed or lost papal tombs include:
 Saint Peter's tomb, around which the following popes were traditionally believed to have been buried: Linus, Anacletus, Evaristus. Telesphorus, Hyginus, Pius I, Anicetus (later transferred to the Catacomb of Callixtus), Victor I. Epigraphic evidence exists only for Linus, with the discovery of a burial slab marked "Linus" in 1615; however, the slab is broken such that it could have once read "Aquilinius" or "Anullinus".
 The Catacombs of Rome, specifically the Catacomb of Callixtus, the Catacomb of Priscilla (and San Silvestro in Capite, built over the catacomb), the Catacomb of Balbina, the Catacomb of Calepodius, the Catacomb of Pontian, and the Catacomb of Felicitas, which were emptied by repeated translations by the ninth century
 Papal tombs in Old St. Peter's Basilica, which once numbered over 100 papal tombs, nearly all of which were destroyed during the sixteenth/seventeenth century demolition
 Archbasilica of Saint John Lateran, where over a dozen tombs were destroyed in two fires (1308 and 1361)

Other destroyed or unknown tombs

1st century

2nd century

5th century

6th century

7th century

9th century

10th century

11th century

12th century

13th century

Notes

References

 Reardon, Wendy J. 2004. The Deaths of the Popes. Macfarland & Company, Inc. 

Tombs, non-extant
Papal
Papal, non-extant